The Xinfengjiang Dam (also known as the Xinfeng Dam) is a gravity dam on the Xinfeng River,  upstream of its confluence with the Dong River, and just west of Heyuan City in Guangdong Province, China. The dam's power station has a 292.5 MW installed capacity and its reservoir supplies water for farming along with drinking water to Guangzhou, Shenzhen and Hong Kong. Construction on the dam began in 1958, the first generator was operational in 1960 and the dam complete in 1962. The dam's reservoir-filling is attributed to several earthquakes within the project area including a 6.1-magnitude (Mw) on March 19, 1962.

Background
On October 20, 1959 the reservoir behind the dam began to fill and in November there were several small earthquakes within the reservoir zone. After the earthquake and as a precaution, cavities within the foundation were reinforced with concrete. This and other upgrades brought the dam to a 9.5--rated resistant design.

Design
The dam's reservoir has a  flood storage capacity, rated for a once in a hundred-year flood. The dam's power station is located at its base (toe) and contains four Francis turbine generators. Three are rated at 72.5 MW and the fourth at 75 MW for a total design capacity of 292.5 MW but the power plant can operate at a maximum 315 MW after later upgrades.

See also

List of power stations in China

References

Hydroelectric power stations in Guangdong
Dams in China
Gravity dams
Dams completed in 1962

de:Xinfeng-Stausee
no:Xinfengjiang-demningen
zh:新丰江水库